Oh, The Story! is an indie pop-rock band based out of Baltimore, Maryland.  Oh, The Story! is currently on indefinite hiatus.

Biography
Oh, The Story! formed after lead vocalist James Larson left the Baltimore-based band, The Late Night, in 2006.

In early 2007, the band entered the studio to start work on their first studio album, Good Morning Illumination.  The album was produced and recorded by Paul Leavitt and was released in May 2007.

Oh, The Story! went through several line-up changes from 2007-2009.  In late 2008, James and guitarist JW Sargent went into the studio with former drummer Evan Chapman to record the band's first EP.

In April 2009, Oh, The Story! released their second release and first EP, Sea Of Stars.  Production and recording on this record were done by Justin Chapman, former keyboardist for Oh, The Story!.

After the record was finished, James and JW found drummer Chris Pollock, bassist Josh Schlotterback, guitarist John Calvin, and keyboardist Scott Swindells after their previous bands had broken up.  Shortly after the release, the band performed at the Journey's Backyard BBQ held at White Marsh Mall in May 2009.  That summer, the band performed on the Ernie Ball Stage at Warped Tour 2009 in Columbia, MD after having won the Ernie Ball Battle Of The Bands 13.

In late 2009, Oh, The Story! was nominated for an MTVu Woodie Award for Best Music On Campus.  In early 2010, Chris Pollock left the band to become the touring drummer for VersaEmerge.  The band replaced Chris with current drummer Jeff Hurn, formerly of the band Go Crash Audio.

Shortly following the events of Chris's departure, the band entered the studio with producer Paul Leavitt to begin work on their third release and second EP, Grow Wings & Sing.  The album was released in July 2010.  During the summer of 2010, Oh, The Story! performed again on the Ernie Ball Stage at Warped Tour 2010 in Columbia, MD.  The band had again won the Ernie Ball Battle Of The Bands 14.

In October 2010, through a tweet the band posted, Oh, The Story! hinted at a possible holiday release.  The band mentioned the release was being worked on with Justin Chapman.

Oh, the Story! began an "indefinite hiatus" at the end of December 2010. Members of the band are currently working on new musical ventures.

Band members
Current members
James Larson - Lead vocals (2005–present)
JW Sargent - Guitar (2008–present)
John Calvin - Guitar (2009–present)
Jeff Hurn - Drums (2010–present)
Josh Schlotterback - Bass guitar, Background vocals (2009–present)
Scott Swindells - Keyboards (2009–present)
Former members
Chris Pollock - Drums (2009–2010)
Justin Chapman - Keyboards
Evan Chapman - Drums
Dave Jachelski - Drums
Steve Zapp - Bass
Michael Lombardi - guitar
Daniel St. Ours - Keyboard

Discography

Studio albums
Good Morning Illumination (Self-Released, 2007)
1. The Overture
2. I Am
3. Come Hell Or High Water
4. Sin, Repent, Repeat
5. The Good Doctor
6. Waking Up
7. Room & Board
8. All Seven Seas
9. Where There's Smoke There's Fire
10. Denouement
11. ...It's Not An Ending At All

EPs
Sea Of Stars (Self-Released, 2009)
1. The Astronomer
2. Keep Your Eyes To The North
3. Astraea
4. Into The Unknown
Grow Wings & Sing (Self-Released, 2010)
1. Grow Wings & Sing
2. Evelyn
3. Never Alone
4. The Truth

Singles
1. All I Want For Christmas (Self-Released, 2010)

Awards
MTVu Woodie Awards
Best Music On Campus Woodie - Nominated in 2009

References

External links
Oh, The Story! on MySpace
Oh, The Story! on Facebook

Indie pop groups from Maryland
Pop punk groups from Maryland
Musical groups established in 2006